The men's time trial at the 1998 UCI Road World Championships was held on Thursday October 8, 1998, from Maastricht to Vilt, within the commune of Valkenburg aan de Geul. The race had a total distance of 43.5 kilometres. There were a total number of 46 competitors, with three disqualifications and one non-starters.

Final classification

References
Results

Men's Time Trial
UCI Road World Championships – Men's time trial